Birdum may refer to.

Birdum  (biogeographic subregion) - refer Interim Biogeographic Regionalisation for Australia
Birdum, Northern Territory, a locality and former town
Birdum Airfield, a former airfield  – see List of Royal Australian Air Force installations
Birdum Historic Site, the  site of the former Town of Birdum,  now in the locality of Larrimah, Northern Territory